"Oh No Not My Baby" is a song written by Gerry Goffin and Carole King. The song's lyrics describe how friends and family repeatedly warn the singer about a partner's infidelities. The song is regarded as an American standard due to its long-time popularity with both music listeners and recording artists.

History
The first released version of "Oh No Not My Baby" was by Maxine Brown, according to whom the song had first been recorded by her Scepter Records' roster-mates the Shirelles with the group's members alternating leads, an approach which had rendered the song unreleasable.

Brown says that Scepter exec Stan Greenberg gave her the song with the advisement that she had to "find the original melody" from the recording by the Shirelles: "they [had gone] so far off by each [group member] taking their own lead, no one knew any more where the real melody stood."

Brown recalls sitting on the porch of her one-level house in Queens listening to the Shirelles' track play through her open window. A group of children skipping rope on the sidewalk picked up the song's main hook before Brown, hearing the children singing "Oh no not my baby" as they skipped, gave Brown the idea for the song's melody. Brown recorded her vocal over the Shirelles' track with the group's vocals erased; Dee Dee Warwick provided the harmony vocal on the chorus.

Released in September 1964, Brown's "Oh No Not My Baby" spent seven weeks in the Top 40 of the Billboard Hot 100 in December 1964 - January 1965 with a #24 peak. The song was included on her second studio album Spotlight on Maxine Brown, released in 1965.

Rod Stewart version
In 1973 Rod Stewart (backed by his Faces bandmates Ron Wood, Kenney Jones and Ian McLagan) charted with "Oh No Not My Baby"; his self-produced version — a single with no parent album — reached #6 UK in September 1973 subsequently reaching #59 on both the U.S., and Canadian charts before the year's end. The B-side, credited on the single to Faces, was "Jodie" written by Ron Wood, Rod Stewart and Ian McLagan.

Cher version

In November 1992, American singer Cher released "Oh No Not My Baby", produced by Peter Asher. The track became a moderate international hit early in 1993. AllMusic editor J. F. Promis called her cover "gutsy."

Track listings
 European 7-inch and cassette single
 "Oh No Not My Baby" – 3:09
 "Love Hurts" – 4:19

 European 12-inch and CD single
 "Oh No Not My Baby" – 3:09
 "Love on a Rooftop" – 4:22
 "Love Hurts" – 4:19
 "Main Man" – 3:48

Charts

Other cover versions
The song was covered by Manfred Mann — whose version of the Shirelles' "Sha La La" had shared the U.S. Top 40 with Brown's "Oh No Not My Baby" — and that group's version of "Oh No Not My Baby", released 9 April 1965, reached #11 in the UK. Not released as a single in the U.S., Manfred Mann's "Oh No Not My Baby" failed to chart in a Canadian release and charted low in Australia at #67.
Dusty Springfield recorded it for her 2nd album Ev'rything's Coming Up Dusty in 1965
Aretha Franklin recorded a rendition of “Oh No, Not My Baby” for her 1970 record Spirit In The Dark with the Muscle Shoals Rhythm Section.
Merry Clayton recorded "Oh No Not My Baby" in a 1972 version which featured co-writer Carole King on piano; produced by Lou Adler, this single reached the Billboard Hot 100 at #72 (#61 on Cash Box Top 100 Singles chart) and the Billboard's Bestselling Soul Singles chart at #30. Despite its mild chart impact, Clayton's track earned a nomination for the Grammy Award for Best Female R&B Vocal Performance for the year 1972.
De Blanc had a minor R&B hit (#70) with "Oh No Not My Baby" in 1976.
Linda Ronstadt recorded "Oh No Not My Baby" for her 1993 Winter Light album; the track reached #35 on Billboard's radio airplay only Hot Adult Contemporary Tracks in 1994. In Canada, the song reached #33 in the Top 100 and #29 on AC charts.
The Partridge Family recorded "Oh No Not My Baby" for their 1973 album Bulletin Board https://en.wikipedia.org/wiki/Bulletin_Board_(album). It was performed on episode 6 of season 4 "Double Trouble" . https://youtu.be/eMjVAusw8Dk

Samples
The introductory riff to Maxine Brown's version was utilised by Gabriella Cilmi on her single "Sanctuary".

References

1964 singles
1965 singles
1973 singles
1992 singles
Songs with lyrics by Gerry Goffin
Songs written by Carole King
Manfred Mann songs
Song recordings produced by John Burgess
Rod Stewart songs
Cher songs
Linda Ronstadt songs
Dusty Springfield songs
Aretha Franklin songs
Carole King songs
The Partridge Family songs
1964 songs
Mercury Records singles
Geffen Records singles
Articles containing video clips
Odyssey (band) songs
Song recordings produced by Peter Asher
Wand Records singles